The transformer utilization factor (TUF) of a rectifier circuit is defined as the ratio of the DC power available at the load resistor to the AC rating of the secondary coil of a transformer.

The  rating of the transformer can be defined as:
TRANSFORMER utilization factor for half wave rectifier is .287 or .3.

References

External links 
 

Engineering ratios
Electric transformers